is a Japanese voice actress from Kanagawa Prefecture. She is affiliated with Aoni Production and has voiced for various anime, video games, and television shows since beginning her career in 2005. Her major roles in video games include Coyori in Battle Fantasia, Caelea in Deception IV: Blood Ties, Aki Koriyama in Tokimeki Memorial 4.  Starting with Samurai Warriors 3, she voices characters Hanbei Takenaka and Ayagozen as well in Warriors Orochi 3.

Filmography

Anime
2010
One Piece as Inazuma (female version) 
2014
World Trigger as Mizunuma-sensei
2015
World Trigger as Yūko Kumagai, Itsuki Fujisawa, Yū Kunichika
2016
Digimon Universe: Appli Monsters as Eri Karan
Sailor Moon Crystal as Cyprine, Ptilol
2017
Kakegurui as Saori
2018
GeGeGe no Kitarō as Neko-Musume
Harukana Receive as Marissa Thomas
2019
Kakegurui ×× as Saori
2020
Fly Me to the Moon as young Nasa
One Piece as Solitaire
2021
Waccha PriMagi! as Amane Sumeragi
2022
Spy × Family as Camilla

Video games
2004
 The Legend of Heroes: Trails in the Sky, Josette Capua
2007
 Battle Fantasia as Coyori
2009
 Samurai Warriors 3, Hanbei Takenaka, Ayagozen
 Tokimeki Memorial 4, Aki Koriyama
2014
 Closers, Ash
 Deception IV: Blood Ties, Caelea
 Samurai Warriors 4, Hanbei Takenaka, Ayagozen
2015
 Kemono Friends as Dodo, Genbu, Chukar Partridge, Jungle Cat, Sumatran Rhinoceros, Markhor and Greater Bird-of-Paradise
2018
 God Eater 3, Hilda Henriquez
 Super Smash Bros. Ultimate (Mii Fighter Type 2/12)
2020
 Touhou Spell Bubble, Sakuya Izayoi
2021
 Fate/Grand Order as Zenobia
2023
 Forspoken as Frey
Unknown date
 Wonderland Online  game Maid no Aoi-san (Fuyu-fuku), Windows

DubbingAnnabelle Comes Home, Daniela Rios (Katie Sarife)Brightburn, Brandon Breyer / Brightburn (Jackson A. Dunn)The Grudge, Detective Muldoon (Andrea Riseborough)The Pale Horse, Hermia Easterbrook (Kaya Scodelario)Proven Innocent, Madeline Scott (Rachelle Lefevre)Richard Jewell, Kathy Scruggs (Olivia Wilde)Vincenzo, Hong Cha-young (Jeon Yeo-been)Younger'',  Lauren Heller (Molly Bernard)

References

External links
  
 
 Umeka Shōji at Oricon 

1985 births
Living people
People from Odawara
Aoni Production voice actors
Japanese video game actresses
Japanese voice actresses
Voice actresses from Kanagawa Prefecture
21st-century Japanese actresses